"Just One More Kiss" may refer to:

"Just One More Kiss" by Bix Beiderbecke Jean Goldkette & His Orchestra
Just One More Kiss (Buck Tick song)
Just One More Kiss (Renée and Renato song) 1983